Rotigotine, sold under the brand name Neupro among others, is a dopamine agonist of the non-ergoline class of medications indicated for the treatment of Parkinson's disease and restless legs syndrome. It is formulated as a once-daily transdermal patch which provides a slow and constant supply of the drug over the course of 24 hours.

Like other dopamine agonists, rotigotine has been shown to possess antidepressant effects and may be useful in the treatment of depression as well.

History 
Initially developed at the University of Groningen in 1985 as N-0437, Aderis Pharmaceuticals acquired rotigotine and continued development toward commercialization.  In 1998, Aderis globally out-licensed rotigotine for development and commercialization to Schwarz Pharma, which firm was acquired by UCB S.A. in 2006. Schwarz completed acquisition of full rights to rotigotine from Aderis as of 2005. 

The drug was approved by the European Medicines Agency (EMA) for use in Europe in 2006. In 2007, the Neupro patch was approved by the Food and Drug Administration (FDA). It became the first transdermal treatment of Parkinson's disease in the United States. In 2008, Schwarz Pharma recalled all Neupro patches in the United States and some in Europe because of problems with the delivery mechanism.  FDA also suspended its marketing authorization after crystal formation was noted in some patches. The patch was reformulated, and was reintroduced in the United States in 2012.

Rotigotine was authorized as a treatment for restless legs syndrome in August 2008.

Side effects 
General side effects for rotigotine may include constipation, dyskinesia, nausea, vomiting, dizziness, fatigue, insomnia, somnolence, confusion, and hallucinations. More serious complications can include psychosis and impulse control disorders like hypersexuality, punding, and pathological gambling. Mild adverse skin reactions at the patch application site may also occur.

Pharmacology 
Rotigotine acts as a non-selective agonist of the dopamine D1, D2, D3, and, to a lesser extent, D4 and D5 receptors, with highest affinity for the D3 receptor. In terms of affinity, rotigotine has 10-fold selectivity for the D3 receptor over the D2, D4, and D5 receptors and 100-fold selectivity for the D3 receptor over the D1 receptor. In functional studies however, rotigotine behaves as a full agonist of D1, D2, and D3 with similar potencies (EC50). Its ability to activate both D1-like and D2-like receptors is similar to the case of apomorphine (which notably has greater efficacy in the treatment of Parkinson's disease than D2-like-selective agonists but has suboptimal pharmacokinetic properties) and pergolide but unlike pramipexole and ropinirole.

Rotigotine possesses the following in vitro receptor binding profile:

 D1 receptor (Ki = 83 nM)
 D2 receptor (Ki = 13.5 nM)
 D3 receptor (Ki = 0.71 nM)
 D4.2 receptor (Ki = 3.9 nM)
 D4.4 receptor (Ki = 15 nM)
 D4.7 receptor (Ki = 5.9 nM)
 D5 receptor (Ki = 5.4 nM)
 α1A-adrenergic receptor (Ki = 176 nM)
 α1B-adrenergic receptor (Ki = 273 nM)
 α2A-adrenergic receptor (Ki = 338 nM)
 α2B-adrenergic receptor (Ki = 27 nM)
 α2C-adrenergic receptor (Ki = 135 nM)
 5-HT1A receptor (Ki = 30 nM)
 5-HT7 receptor (Ki = 86 nM)
 H1 receptor (Ki = 330 nM)

All affinities listed were assayed using human materials except that for α2B-adrenergic which was done with NG 108–15 cells. Rotigotine behaves as a partial or full agonist (depending on the assay) at all dopamine receptors listed, as an antagonist at the α2B-adrenergic receptor, and as a partial agonist at the 5-HT1A receptor. Though it has affinity for a large number of sites as shown above, at clinical doses rotigotine behaves mostly as a selective D1-like (D1, D5) and D2-like (D2, D3, D4) receptor agonist, with its α2B-adrenergic and 5-HT1A activity also possibly having some minor relevance.

See also 
 Piribedil
 Pramipexole
 Ropinirole

References

External links

 Rotigotine (SPM-962) - The First Once-a-Day Transdermal Patch to Treat Parkinson's Disease

5-HT1A agonists
Adrenergic receptor modulators
Alpha-2 blockers
Aminotetralins
D1-receptor agonists
D2-receptor agonists
D3 receptor agonists
D4 receptor agonists
D5 receptor agonists
Phenols
Thiophenes